All the Above may refer to:
 "All the Above" (Beanie Sigel song)
 "All the Above" (Maino song)

See also
 All of the above (disambiguation)